This is a list of the 325 members of the 11th legislature of the Italian Senate that were elected on the 1992 general election. The legislature met from 23 April 1992 to 14 April 1994.

Senators for life are marked with a "(L)"

Christian Democracy

Democratic Party of the Left

Italian Socialist Party

Lega Nord

Communist Refoundation Party

Italian Social Movement

Italian Republican Party
Libero Gualtieri
Giorgio Covi
Giuseppe Dipaola
Roberto Giunta
Luciano Benetton
Giovanni Ferrara
Vincenzo Garraffa
Antonio Maccanico
Giovanni Spadolini (L)
Armando Stefanelli
Leo Valiani (L)
Bruno Visentini

Greens/The Net
Carla Rocchi
Carmine Mancuso
Emilio Molinari
Girolamo Cannariato
Vito Ferrara
Giuseppina Maisano Grassi
Annamaria Procacci

Italian Liberal Party
Luigi Compagna
Giacomo Paire
Francesco Candioto
Valentino Martelli
Carlo Scognamiglio

Mixed group
Roland Riz
Luigi Biscardi
Giovanni Agnelli (L)
Vincenza Bono Parrino
Francesco Candioto

References

List
Lists of political office-holders in Italy
Lists of legislators by term
Lists of members of upper houses